Diocese of Canberra and Goulburn or Archdiocese of Canberra and Goulburn could refer to:
Anglican Diocese of Canberra and Goulburn in the Anglican Church of Australia
Roman Catholic Archdiocese of Canberra and Goulburn in the Roman Catholic Church in Australia